Samuel ben Kalonymus he-Hasid of Speyer (1120-1175), was a Tosafist, liturgical poet, and philosopher of the 12th century, surnamed also "the Prophet" (Solomon Luria, Responsa, No. 29). He seems to have lived in Spain and in France. He is quoted in the tosafot to Yebamot (61b) and Soṭah (12a), as well as by Samuel b. Meïr (RaSHBaM) in his commentary on Arbe Pesaḥim (Pes. 109a).

He was the first of the Chassidei Ashkenaz, and the father of Judah ben Samuel of Regensburg.

Samuel was the author of a commentary on the treatise Tamid, mentioned by Abraham b. David in his commentary thereon, and of a liturgical poem, entitled Shir ha-Yiḥud, divided into seven parts corresponding to the seven days of the week. This poem is a philosophical hymn on the unity of God, for which Ibn Gabirol's Keter Malkut served as the basis. Like the latter, Samuel he-Ḥasid treats of the divine nature from the negative side, that is to say, from the point of view that God is not like man. The Hebrew, if not very poetical, is pure; but foreign words are used for the philosophical terms. The recitation of the poem was forbidden by Solomon Luria; but other rabbis, among whom was Samuel Judah Katzenellenbogen, who wrote a commentary on it, decided to the contrary. On the different opinions concerning the authorship of the Shir ha-Yiḥud see L. Dukes in Orient, Lit. vii., cols. 483, 484.

According to legend, he was said to have created a golem which accompanied him on his travels and served him, but could not speak.

References

 Its bibliography:
Michael, Or ha-Ḥayyim, p. 592;
L. Dukes, Orient, Lit. vii, cols. 483–488;
idem, Neuhebräische Religiöse Poesie, p. 105;
Landshuth, Siddur Hegyon Leb, pp. 529–531;
Steinschneider, Cat. Bodl. cols. 2413–2417;
Zunz, Z. G. pp. 55, 72, 74.

External links 
 Traditional Sphardic Singing of Samuel of Speyer Shabbat Song Shabbat HaYom L'Hashem

Jewish poets
12th-century poets
Tosafists
German Ashkenazi Jews